The 2007 Denver mayoral election was held on May 1, 2007. Since John Hickenlooper obtained an absolute majority of the vote in the initial round of voting, no runoff was held.

Results

References

Denver
2007
Mayoral elections in Denver
2007 Colorado elections
John Hickenlooper